Zathura is a free, plugin-based document viewer. Plugins are available for PDF (via poppler or MuPDF), PostScript and DjVu. It was written to be lightweight and controlled with vi-like keybindings. Zathura's customizability makes it well-liked by many Linux users.

Zathura has official packages available in Arch Linux,
Debian,
Fedora,
Gentoo,
OpenBSD,
OpenSUSE,
Source Mage,
Ubuntu,
and an unofficial macOS package provided by MacPorts.

Zathura was named after the 2002 book Zathura and the 2005 film Zathura: A Space Adventure.

History 

Development on Zathura began on 12 August 2009. On 18 September 2009, version 0.0.1 was announced to the Arch Linux community.

Zathura has been an official Arch Linux package since April 2010. Same year, by the end of July it was added to the Source Mage Linux distribution. It has been an official Debian package since at least 2011, as part of Debian Squeeze.

Features 

Zathura automatically reloads documents. When working in compiled documents such as those written in LaTeX, Zathura will refresh the output whenever compilation takes place. Zathura has the option of enabling inverse search (using "synctex").

Zathura can adjust the document to best-fit or to fit width, and it can rotate pages. It can view pages side-by-side and has a fullscreen mode. Pages can also be recolored to have a black background and white foreground.

Zathura can search for text and copy text to the primary X selection. It supports bookmarks and can open encrypted files.

The behavior and appearance of Zathura can be customized using a configuration file. Zathura has the ability to execute external shell commands. It can be opened in tabs using .

Zathura implements an optional sandbox mode using seccomp filter to restrict the consequences of potential vulnerabilities.

See also 

 List of PDF software

References

External links
 
 

Free PDF readers
PostScript
Free software programmed in C
Office software that uses GTK
Electronic documents
Software that uses Meson